The Ritom funicular is a funicular railway in the canton of Ticino, Switzerland. It links a lower terminus at Piotta, in the valley of the Ticino River near the southern portal of the Gotthard Tunnel, with an upper terminus at Piora, a  walk from Ritom Lake. There is also an intermediate stop at Altanca.

History
The Ritom Lake is in fact a reservoir, constructed in 1917 in order collect the waters of the Saint-Gotthard Massif for a power station at Piotta, in order to produce electricity for the Gotthard railway. The funicular was originally constructed to facilitate the building of the pipeline carrying this water, which it parallels, but was opened for public use in 1921.

The line was extensively rebuilt in 1977/8, and the original car was replaced by a new one in 1985. The original car, replaced in 1985, is displayed at the lower station.

At its opening, and until the opening of the Gelmerbahn funicular, the Ritom funicular was the steepest funicular in Switzerland.

Operation 
The line has the following parameters:

See also 
 List of funicular railways
 List of funiculars in Switzerland

References

External links 

 Web site of the Region Ritom-Piora with information on the funicular and surroundings
 The Ritom funicular's entry on the Swiss Inventory of Ropeways

Funicular railways in Switzerland
Metre gauge railways in Switzerland
Transport in Ticino
Railway lines opened in 1921